BVO can refer to
 Brominated vegetable oil, a food additive
 the International Air Transport Association (IATA) airport code for the American Bartlesville Municipal Airport, in Bartlesville, Oklahoma
 Bundesverdienstorden, the Order of Merit of the Federal Republic of Germany